Pavel Valeryevich Vavilov (born 20 August 1972) is a Russian former biathlete. He competed in the men's 20 km individual event at the 1998 Winter Olympics.

References

External links
 

1972 births
Living people
Russian male biathletes
Olympic biathletes of Russia
Biathletes at the 1998 Winter Olympics
People from Tyumen
Sportspeople from Tyumen Oblast